George Soros has been described as "the perfect code word" for conspiracy theories that unite antisemitism and Islamophobia. One prominent Soros-related conspiracy theory is that he is behind the European migrant crisis or importing migrants to European countries. Under the current second premiership of Viktor Orbán, the Hungarian government has spent millions of dollars on a poster campaign demonizing Soros. According to anthropologist Ivan Kalmar, "[m]any of his most outspoken enemies inside and outside Hungary saw him as leading an international cabal that included other Jews such as the Rothschilds, as well as Freemasons and Illuminati."

Soros's philanthropy and support for progressive causes has made him the subject of many conspiracy theories, some of them originating from the political right. Veronika Bondarenko, writing for Business Insider said that "For two decades, some have seen Soros as a kind of puppet master secretly controlling the global economy and politics." The New York Times describes the allegations as moving "from the dark corners of the internet and talk radio" to "the very center of the political debate" by 2018.

Soros has become a magnet for such theories, with opponents claiming that he is behind such diverse events as the 2017 Women's March, the fact-checking website Snopes, the gun-control activism engaged in by the survivors of the Stoneman Douglas High School shooting, the October 2018 Central American immigrant caravans, and protests against the Brett Kavanaugh Supreme Court nomination. President Donald Trump in a tweet also claimed Soros was backing the protests against Kavanaugh's nomination.

American conservatives picked up on the thread in the late 2000s, spearheaded by Fox News. Bill O'Reilly gave an almost ten-minute monolog on Soros in 2007, calling him an "extremist" and claiming he was "off-the-charts dangerous". According to The Times journalist David Aaronovitch in London, Breitbart News has regularly published articles blaming Soros for anything of which it disapproves.

Examples

1990s
In 1997, during the Asian financial crisis, the prime minister of Malaysia, Mahathir Mohamad, accused Soros of using the wealth under his control to punish the Association of Southeast Asian Nations (ASEAN) for welcoming Myanmar as a member. With a history of antisemitic remarks, Mahathir made specific reference to Soros's Jewish background ("It is a Jew who triggered the currency plunge") and implied Soros was orchestrating the crash as part of a larger Jewish conspiracy. Nine years later, in 2006, Mahathir met with Soros and afterward stated that he accepted that Soros had not been responsible for the crisis. In 1998's The Crisis of Global Capitalism: Open Society Endangered, Soros explained his role in the crisis as follows:

The financial crisis that originated in Thailand in 1997 was particularly unnerving because of its scope and severity ... By the beginning of 1997, it was clear to Soros Fund Management that the discrepancy between the trade account and the capital account was becoming untenable. We sold short the Thai baht and the Malaysian ringgit early in 1997 with maturities ranging from six months to a year. (That is, we entered into contracts to deliver at future dates Thai baht and Malaysian ringgit that we did not currently hold.) Subsequently, Prime Minister Mahathir of Malaysia accused me of causing the crisis, a wholly unfounded accusation. We were not sellers of the currency during or several months before the crisis; on the contrary, we were buyers when the currencies began to decline—we were purchasing ringgits to realize the profits on our earlier speculation. (Much too soon, as it turned out. We left most of the potential gain on the table because we were afraid that Mahathir would impose capital controls. He did so, but much later.)

2010s
Soros's opposition to Brexit led to a front page on the United Kingdom's Conservative Party-supporting newspaper The Daily Telegraph in February 2018, which was accused of antisemitism for claiming he was involved in a supposed "secret plot" for the country's voters to reverse the 2016 United Kingdom European Union membership referendum. While The Daily Telegraph did not mention that Soros is Jewish, his opposition to Britain leaving the European Union had been reported elsewhere in less conspiratorial terms. Stephen Pollard, editor of The Jewish Chronicle, said on Twitter: "The point is that language matters so much and this is exactly the language being used by antisemites here and abroad." In October 2019, the then Leader of the House of Commons, Jacob Rees-Mogg, accused Soros of being the "funder-in-chief" of the Remain campaign, and was subsequently accused of antisemitism by opposition MPs.

After being ousted from office in the wake of the Panama Papers scandal of 2016, Icelandic Prime Minister Sigmundur Davíð Gunnlaugsson accused Soros of having bankrolled a conspiracy to remove him from power. It was later noted that Soros himself had also been implicated in the Panama Papers, casting doubt on the prime minister's theory.

Following a December 20, 1998, 60 Minutes interview, in which Soros related his experiences when at the age of 13 the Nazis occupied his native Hungary, right-wing figures such as Alex Jones, Dinesh D'Souza, Glenn Beck, Roseanne Barr, James Woods, Ann Coulter, Louie Gohmert, Marjorie Taylor Greene, and Donald Trump Jr., promulgated the false conspiracy theory, which has been described as antisemitic, that Soros was a Nazi collaborator who turned in other Jews and stole their property during the occupation.

In October 2018, Soros was accused of funding the Central American migrant caravans heading toward the United States. The theory that Soros was causing Central American migration at the southern US border apparently dates back to late March 2018. The October 2018 strain of the theory has been described to combine antisemitism, anti-immigrant sentiment, and "the specter of powerful foreign agents controlling major world events in pursuit of a hidden agenda", connecting Soros and other wealthy individuals of Jewish faith or background to the October caravan. Then-US president Donald Trump was among those promoting the conspiracy theory. Both Cesar Sayoc, the perpetrator of the October 2018 attempted bombings of prominent Democratic Party officials, and Robert Bowers, the perpetrator of the Pittsburgh synagogue shooting, referred to this conspiracy theory on social media before their crimes.

In November 2018, Turkish President Recep Tayyip Erdoğan denounced Soros while speaking about the political purges in Turkey, saying: "The person who financed terrorists during the Gezi incidents is already in prison. And who is behind him? The famous Hungarian Jew Soros. This is a man who assigns people to divide nations and shatter them."

In November 2019, attorney Joseph diGenova, who is known for promoting conspiracy theories about the Department of Justice and the FBI, asserted on Fox News without evidence that Soros "controls a very large part of the career foreign service of the United States State Department" and "also controls the activities of FBI agents overseas who work for NGOs – work with NGOs. That was very evident in Ukraine." Soros's Open Society Foundation described diGenova's claims as "beyond rhetorical ugliness, beyond fiction, beyond ludicrous" and requested that Fox News provide an on-air retraction of diGenova's claims, and stop providing diGenova with a platform. Although the network never publicly announced it had banned him, diGenova has not appeared on Fox following the incident. In September 2020, diGenova suggested that Fox News is also controlled by Soros.

2020s
A study by Zignal Labs found that unsubstantiated claims of involvement by Soros were one of three dominant themes in misinformation and conspiracy theories around the 2020 George Floyd protests, alongside claims that Floyd's murder had been faked and claims of involvement by antifa groups. The Anti-Defamation League estimated that over four days after Floyd's murder, negative Twitter messages about Soros increased from about 20,000 per day to about 500,000 per day.

After the July 2020 Armenian–Azerbaijani clashes on the border, the president of Azerbaijan, Ilham Aliyev, stated that the 2018 Armenian revolution was "another provocation by Soros and his entourage", and called the government of the Prime Minister of Armenia, Nikol Pashinyan, the "agents of the Soros Foundation", citing the aid for the COVID-19 pandemic in Armenia by the Soros Foundation. Aliyev added that there were "no traces of the Soros Foundation in Azerbaijan" because it had "cut off their legs", as they were "poisoning the minds of youth", turning them "against their state". During the height of the 2020 Nagorno-Karabakh war in October, Aliyev labeled Soros's activities a "destructive, movement, and a colonial movement". He also added that Soros "came to power in Armenia today, but failed."

See also
Antisemitic canard
Zionist Occupation Government conspiracy theory

References

Further reading

Conspiracy theories involving Jews
Conspiracy theories involving Muslims
Conspiracy theories